The Balkan Athletics Indoor Championships, also known as the Balkan Indoor Games, is an annual international indoor track and field competition between athletes from the Balkan Peninsula. Following a test event in 1991, it was officially launched in 1994. Organised by the Association of the Balkan Athletics Federations (ABAF), it is typically held in February.

Guest competitors from outside of the Balkan Athletics grouping have competed at the competition, but are not considered as formal winners or champions at the competition.

Men

60 metres
1991: 
1994: 
1995: 
1996: 
1997: 
1998: 
1999: 
2000: 
2001: 
2002: 
2003: 
2004: 
2005: 
2006:

200 metres
1991: 
1994: 
1995: 
1996: 
1997: 
1998: 
1999: 
2000: 
2001: 
2002: 
2003: 
2004: 
2005:

400 metres
1991: 
1994: 
1995: 
1996: 
1997: 
1998: 
1999: 
2000: 
2001: 
2002: 
2003: 
2004: 
2005: 
2006:

800 metres
1991: 
1994: 
1995: 
1996: 
1997: 
1998: 
1999: 
2000: 
2001: 
2002: 
2003: 
2004: 
2005: 
2006:

1500 metres
1991: 
1994: 
1995: 
1996: 
1997: 
1998: 
1999: 
2000: 
2001: 
2002: 
2003: 
2004: 
2005: 
2006:

3000 metres
1991: 
1994: 
1995: 
1996: 
1997: 
1998: 
1999: 
2000: 
2001: 
2002: 
2003: 
2004: 
2005: 
2006:

60 metres hurdles
1991: 
1994: 
1995: 
1996: 
1997: 
1998: 
1999: 
2000: 
2001: 
2002: 
2003: 
2004: 
2005: 
2006:

High jump
1991: 
1994: 
1995: 
1996: 
1997: 
1998: 
1999: 
2000: 
2001: 
2002: 
2003: 
2004: 
2005: 
2006:

Pole vault
1991: 
1994: 
1995: 
1996: 
1997: 
1998: 
1999: 
2000: 
2001: 
2002: 
2003: 
2004: 
2005: 
2006:

Long jump
1991: 
1994: 
1995: 
1996: 
1997: 
1998: 
1999: 
2000: 
2001: 
2002: 
2003: 
2004: 
2005: 
2006:

Triple jump
1991: 
1994: 
1995: 
1996: 
1997: 
1998: 
1999: 
2000: 
2001: 
2002: 
2003: 
2004: 
2005: 
2006:

Shot put
1991: 
1994: 
1995: 
1996: 
1997: 
1998: 
1999: 
2000: 
2001: 
2002: 
2003: 
2004: 
2005: 
2006:

5000 metres walk
1994:

Women

60 metres
1991: 
1994: 
1995: 
1996: 
1997: 
1998: 
1999: 
2000: 
2001: 
2002: 
2003: 
2004: 
2005: 
2006:

200 metres
1991: 
1994: 
1995: 
1996: 
1997: 
1998: 
1999: 
2000: 
2001: 
2002: 
2003: 
2004: 
2005:

400 metres
1991: 
1994: 
1995: 
1996: 
1997: 
1998: 
1999: 
2000: 
2001: 
2002: 
2003: 
2004: 
2005: 
2006:

800 metres
1991: 
1994: 
1995: 
1996: 
1997: 
1998: 
1999: 
2000: 
2001: 
2002: 
2003: 
2004: 
2005: 
2006:

1500 metres
1991: 
1994: 
1995: 
1996: 
1997: 
1998: 
1999: 
2000: 
2001: 
2002: 
2003: 
2004: 
2005: 
2006:

3000 metres
1991: 
1994: 
1995: 
1996: 
1997: 
1998: 
1999: 
2000: 
2001: 
2002: 
2003: 
2004: 
2005: 
2006:

60 metres hurdles
1991: 
1994: 
1995: 
1996: 
1997: 
1998: 
1999: 
2000: 
2001: 
2002: 
2003: 
2004: 
2005: 
2006:

High jump
1991: 
1994: 
1995: 
1996: 
1997: 
1998: 
1999: 
2000: 
2001: 
2002: 
2003: 
2004: 
2005: 
2006:

Pole vault
1998: 
1999: 
2000: 
2001: 
2002: 
2003: 
2004: 
2005: 
2006:

Long jump
1991: 
1994: 
1995: 
1996: 
1997: 
1998: 
1999: 
2000: 
2001: 
2002: 
2003: 
2004: 
2005: 
2006:

Triple jump
1994: 
1995: 
1996: 
1997: 
1998: 
1999: 
2000: 
2001: 
2002: 
2003: 
2004: 
2005: 
2006:

Shot put
1991: 
1994: 
1995: 
1996: 
1997: 
1998: 
1999: 
2000: 
2001: 
2002: 
2003: 
2004: 
2005: 
2006:

3000 metres walk
1994:

References

Champions 1991
«Ματιές στα Σπορ» (Views on Sports), vol. 29 (January 1992), p. 43.
Champions 1994–2006
Balkan Indoor Championships. GBR Athletics. Retrieved 2021-01-22.

Winners
 List
Balkan Indoor Championships